The EMBO Gold Medal is an annual award of the European Molecular Biology Organization (EMBO) given to young scientists for outstanding contributions to the life sciences in Europe. Laureates receive a medal and €10,000 and are invited to receive the award and present their research at the annual EMBO Meeting and to write a review published in The EMBO Journal. Medallists can only be nominated by EMBO Members.

EMBO Gold Medallists
Previous EMBO Gold Medal awardees include

 2022 Prisca Liberali, CH
 2021 Andrea Ablasser, CH
 2020 , BE, and Markus Ralser, DE
 2019 M. Madan Babu, UK, and Paola Picotti, CH
 2018 , CH, and Melina Schuh, DE
 2017 Maya Schuldiner, IL
 2016 , CH, and Ben Lehner, ES
 2015 Sarah Teichmann, UK, and Ido Amit, IL
 2014  Sophie G. Martin, CH
 2013  , NL
 2012  , BE
 2011  Simon Boulton, UK
 2010  , UK
 2009  Olivier Voinnet, FR (revoked in January 2016)
 2008 James Briscoe, UK
 2007  Jan Löwe, UK
 2006  Frank Uhlmann, UK
 2005  Dario Alessi, UK
 2004  María Blasco, ES
 2003  Anthony Hyman, DE
 2002  Amanda Fisher, UK
 2001  , UK
 1999  Konrad Basler, CH
 1998  , IT
 1997 , DE
 1996  Enrico Coen, UK
 1995 Richard Treisman, UK
 1994  Paolo Sassone-Corsi, IT
 1993  Jim Smith, UK
 1992  Carl-Henrik Heldin, SE
 1991  , FR
 1990 Erwin Wagner, AT
 1989  Hugh Pelham, UK
 1988  Antonio Lanzavecchia, IT
 1987  Barbara Pearse, UK
 1986  John Tooze, DE

See also

 List of biology awards

References

Awards established in 1986
Biology awards
European Molecular Biology Organization
European science and technology awards